Jürgen Säumel (born 8 September 1984) is an Austrian former professional footballer who played as a midfielder.

Club career
After Säumel's contract with SK Sturm Graz expired, he decided to sign for Torino on 22 July 2008 on a three-year contract. After a season with Torino and a half-year loan spell at Brescia, he signed for MSV Duisburg.

International career
Säumel was a member of the Austrian UEFA Euro 2008 squad, making his first appearance of Euro 2008 for the host nation in a 1–0 defeat to Croatia. He was substituted after 61 minutes, being replaced by the veteran Ivica Vastić.

References

External links
 

1984 births
Living people
People from Sankt Veit an der Glan District
Austrian footballers
Austria international footballers
UEFA Euro 2008 players
Association football midfielders
SK Sturm Graz players
Torino F.C. players
Brescia Calcio players
MSV Duisburg players
SC Wiener Neustadt players
FC Wacker Innsbruck (2002) players
Austrian Football Bundesliga players
2. Liga (Austria) players
Austrian expatriate footballers
Expatriate footballers in Italy
Expatriate footballers in Germany
Austrian expatriate sportspeople in Italy
Austrian expatriate sportspeople in Germany
Serie A players
Serie B players
2. Bundesliga players
Footballers from Carinthia (state)